The Isles of Scilly Fire and Rescue Service is the statutory local authority fire and rescue service covering the Isles of Scilly off the coast of the South West of England. It is the smallest fire and rescue service in the United Kingdom and the only one to be staffed entirely by retained firefighters.

The service shares management, and cooperates closely with the airport rescue and fire fighting service (St Mary's Airport RFFS) on St Mary's, which is the only other fire service on the Isles of Scilly.

Fire stations and appliances

Isles of Scilly Fire and Rescue Service

St Mary's Airport Rescue and Fire Fighting Service

Personnel 

The fire service has 42 on-call firefighters in the ranks of firefighter, crew manager, watch manager, and station manager. The single station manager post (previously shared with the airport fire service) is, vacant and under review.

The service is led by a chief fire executive. Until 2017, this was a uniformed role, with the rank of Chief Fire Officer, but the position is now a non-uniformed appointment, held by the deputy chief executive of the Council of the Scilly Isles. This council officer is also responsible for the airport fire service.

The fire service also has non-operational support staff.

Inspections 
The fire service has a responsibility for domestic and commercial inspections of premises for fire safety. It carries out these inspections on the smaller islands, but contracts them on the main island (St Mary's), where domestic inspections are carried out by the full-time firefighters of the airport fire service, and commercial premises inspections are carried out by Cornwall Fire and Rescue Service.

Performance
In 2018/2019, every fire and rescue service in England and Wales was subjected to a statutory inspection by Her Majesty's Inspectorate of Constabulary and Fire & Rescue Services (HIMCFRS). The inspection investigated how well the service performs in each of three areas. On a scale of outstanding, good, requires improvement and inadequate, Isles of Scilly Fire and Rescue Service was rated as follows:

See also

List of British firefighters killed in the line of duty

References

External links
 
Isled of Scilly Fire and Rescue Service at HMICFRS

Fire and rescue services of England
Isles of Scilly